Lee Yong-shin (Hangul: 이용신; born February 27, 1979) is a South Korean voice actress and singer born and raised in Seoul, South Korea.

She began her career by joining CJ ENM's voice acting division in 2003. In the following year, she gained popularity with her role as Mitsuki Kōyama (known as Luna in South Korea) on the Korean dub of Full Moon. She gave birth to a masterpiece called new future in the full moon.
Since then, Lee has dubbed numerous television animation series such as Alice Academy, My Guardian Characters, Sgt. Frog and Tsubasa: Reservoir Chronicle. She also participated in dubbing video games, voicing Ahri of League of Legends and Nova Terra of StarCraft II: Wings of Liberty.

In addition to having been highly active as a voice actress, Lee has recently built her career as a singer by holding her first solo live concert in 2010 and releasing her first studio album in 2013. Her debut album, Type Control, was reported to be the first full-length album recorded by a voice actor in Lee's native country.

Career

Voice acting

TV animation dubbing
 Alice Academy (학원 앨리스, Korean TV edition, Tooniverse)
 Mikan Sakura
 Asagiri no Miko (아침 안개의 무녀, Korean TV edition, Tooniverse)
 Kukuri Shirayama
 Bleach (블리치, Korean TV edition, Tooniverse)
 Soi Fon
 Chrono Crusade (크로노 크루세이드, Korean TV edition, Tooniverse)
 Sister Claire
 Clannad (클라나드, Korean TV edition, Anibox TV)
 Nagisa Furukawa
 Detective School Q (탐정학원 Q, Korean TV edition, Tooniverse)
 Sakurako Yukihira
 Full Moon (달빛천사, Korean TV edition, Tooniverse)
 Full Moon
 Mitsuki Koyama
 Fushigiboshi no Futagohime (신비한 별의 쌍둥이 공주, Korean TV edition, Tooniverse)
 Altessa
 Esteban
 Nina
 Galaxy Angel (갤럭시 엔젤, Korean TV edition, Animax)
 Milfeulle Sakuraba
 Great Teacher Onizuka (GTO, Korean TV edition, Tooniverse)
 Tomoko Nomura
 Kaleido Star (카레이도 스타, Korean TV edition, Tooniverse)
 Marion Benigni
 Magical Girl Lyrical Nanoha (마법소녀 리리컬 나노하, Korean TV edition, Tooniverse)
 Nanoha Takamachi
 My Guardian Characters (캐릭캐릭 체인지, Korean TV edition, Tooniverse)
 Amu Hinamori
 Naruto (나루토, Korean TV edition, Tooniverse)
 Temari
 Ouran High School Host Club (오란고교 사교클럽, Korean TV edition, Tooniverse)
 Chizuru Maihara
 Rozen Maiden (로젠 메이든, Korean TV edition, Tooniverse)
 Hinaichigo
 Sgt. Frog (개구리 중사 케로로, Korean TV edition, Tooniverse)
 Angol Mois
 Shakugan no Shana (작안의 샤나, Korean TV edition, Animax)
 Yukari Hirai
 Sugar Sugar Rune (슈가슈가 룬, Korean TV edition, Tooniverse)
 Waffle
 Tsubasa: Reservoir Chronicle (츠바사 크로니클, Korean TV edition, Tooniverse)
 Sakura

Video game dubbing
 Halo: Reach (헤일로: 리치)
 Noble 6 (female)
 League of Legends (리그 오브 레전드)
 Ahri
 Katarina
 Master X Master 
 Vita
 StarCraft II: Wings of Liberty (스타크래프트 2: 자유의 날개)
 Nova Terra
Dungeon Fighter Online (던전 앤 파이터) - Female Gunner
Elsword (엘소드) - ROSE
MapleStory (메이플스토리)
Angelic Buster
Seren

Discography
 Studio albums

References

External links
 Lee Yong-shin's profile on CJ E&M Voice Acting Division
 Lee Yong-shin's official site

Living people
South Korean voice actresses
1979 births